Kenneth Robert Dunek (born June 20, 1957) is a former professional American football tight end who played in the National Football League (NFL) for the Philadelphia Eagles and in the United States Football League (USFL) for the Philadelphia/Baltimore Stars.

Dunek attended college at Memphis State (now known as University of Memphis) and played forward on the basketball team. He switched to football his senior year in hopes of playing in the NFL. In 1980, he earned a spot on the Philadelphia Eagles roster as a tight end and played for one season. He now resides in Mount Laurel, New Jersey, and works as an author, motivational speaker, film producer, and publisher of JerseyMan and PhillyMan Magazines.

References

1957 births
Living people
Players of American football from Chicago
Philadelphia/Baltimore Stars players
Philadelphia Eagles players
Memphis Tigers football players
American football tight ends
People from Mount Laurel, New Jersey